STS-61-F was a NASA Space Shuttle mission planned to launch on 15 May 1986 using Challenger. It was canceled after Challenger was destroyed earlier that year.

Crew

Mission objectives 
The main objective of STS-61-F was to deploy the Ulysses solar probe, which would travel to Jupiter and use it as a gravitational slingshot in order to be placed into 
polar orbit around the Sun. This mission would have marked the first use of the Centaur-G liquid-fueled payload booster, which would also be used on the subsequent mission to send the Galileo probe in orbit around Jupiter.

Due to the use of the Centaur-G and its volatile propellants, this mission was considered to be one of the most dangerous Space Shuttle flights attempted, with the Chief of the Astronaut Office John W. Young referring to the two Centaur flights as the "Death Star" flights. The flight was risky enough that Commander Hauck gave his crewmates an option to leave the crew if they considered the mission to be too unsafe.

After the loss of Challenger, most of the crew (without Roy D. Bridges Jr., who left NASA in 1986) would fly as the crew of the first post-Challenger mission, STS-26. Bridges was replaced by Richard O. Covey and a third Mission Specialist (George D. "Pinky" Nelson) was added to the crew. Ulysses was eventually deployed from Discovery on STS-41, using the solid-fueled Inertial Upper Stage (IUS) and Payload Assist Module (PAM-S) instead of the Centaur-G, which had been canceled after the Challenger disaster.

See also 

 Canceled Space Shuttle missions
 STS-26
 STS-41

References 

Cancelled Space Shuttle missions